Elections of the Dutch Senate were held on 26 May 2015. The elected senators were sworn in on 9 June 2015.

Electoral system
The Senate is elected by the members of the States-Provincial of the country's twelve provinces, who had been directly elected by the citizens two months earlier, in the 2015 provincial elections. The value of a vote is determined by the population of the province in which the voter is a member of the States-Provincial. The seats are distributed in one nationwide constituency using party-list proportional representation.

Results

2015
Senate